The  New York Giants season was the franchise's 35th season in the National Football League. The Giants' defense became the second defense in the history of the NFL to lead the league in fewest rushing yards, fewest passing yards and fewest total yards. The 1959 Giants scored 284 points, more than in any of the previous four seasons in which Vince Lombardi was their offensive coordinator.

Schedule

Game summaries

Week 1

    
    
    
    
    
    
    
    

Charlie Conerly 21/31, 321 Yds

Playoffs

Standings

Awards and honors
Don Chandler, Franchise Record, Highest Punting Average, 48.6 Yards per Punt 
Charley Conerly, NFL MVP

See also
List of New York Giants seasons

References

 New York Giants on Pro Football Reference
 Giants on jt-sw.com

New York Giants seasons
New York Giants
1959 in sports in New York City
1950s in the Bronx